The Naval Museum of Uruguay is located in the Rambla de Gaulle s/n, Pocitos neighbourhood, Montevideo, Uruguay. 

It hosts a number of historical cannons, as well as models, photographs and memorabilia of the Uruguayan Navy. It also has a library and an archive. It is located between Playa de los Pocitos and Puerto del Buceo.

References

Maritime museums
Museums in Montevideo
Pocitos, Montevideo
Military and war museums in Uruguay